Kim King was an American college football player.

Kim King may also refer to:
Kim King (politician), member of the Kentucky House of Representatives
Carolyn King (zoologist), New Zealand mammalogist